Rockerbox is the fifth album by the Canadian rock band Chilliwack, released in December 1975.   The album was released by Sire Records in the US (Sire 7511), who had previously released the US version of Chilliwack's prior album, Riding High.  In Canada, Rockerbox was released with a different cover by Casino Records (successors-in-interest to Chilliwack's previous Canadian label, Goldfish Records) and was Chilliwack's least successful album there.  The album was produced by Sire Records' staff producers Craig Leon and Richard Gottehrer, who were better known for rock productions; as a result, it has a reputation as Chilliwack's most straight-ahead "rock" album.

As of 2022, this is the only Chilliwack album not to have been reissued in CD format.

Track listing
"If You Want My Love" (Henderson, Turney) (5:45)
"I Know, You Know" (Henderson, Turney, Froese) (3:00)
"When You Gonna Tell the Truth" (Henderson, Turney, Miller) (3:23)
"Train's a Comin' Back" (Henderson, Turney, Miller) (3:08)
"Marianne" (Henderson, Turney) (6:44)
"Treat Me Fine, Treat Me Good" (Henderson, Turney) (3:40)
"Magnolia" (Henderson, Turney, Miller, Froese) (3:15)
"Last Day of December" (Henderson, Turney) (4:02)

Personnel
Chilliwack
Bill Henderson - guitar, vocals
Glenn Miller - bass, vocals
Ross Turney - drums, percussion
Howard Froese - guitar, vocals
with:
Bassett Hand - arranger and conductor on "If You Want My Love"

1975 albums
Chilliwack (band) albums
Sire Records albums
Albums produced by Craig Leon
Albums produced by Richard Gottehrer